Thompson Peak, at  above sea level is the highest peak in the Sawtooth Range of Idaho. The summit of Thompson Peak is located within Custer County, although some of the lower portion of the mountain is in Boise County. Thompson Peak is also located within the Sawtooth Wilderness portion of the Sawtooth National Recreation Area, a unit of Sawtooth National Forest.

Redfish Lake, Little Redfish Lake, and the visitor services at these locations are only a few miles from Thompson Peak.

There are a total of four routes to the top of Thompson Peak: South Couloir - , Southwest Couloir - 5.2, Northeast Face - 5.8, West Crack - 5.2.  The easiest way to access Thompson Peak is from the Redfish Lake trailhead and to take the Fishhook Creek Trail to the Alpine Way Trail.  From there, follow the Alpine Way Trail to the base of Williams Peak before going off trail up to an unnamed lake to the northeast of Thompson Peak.  Then, head up to the saddle between Thompson and Williams Peaks before making the class 3 scramble on the west-southwest side of the peak that begins on the Thompson-Mickey's Spire saddle.

See also

 List of peaks of the Sawtooth Range (Idaho)
 List of mountains of Idaho
 List of mountain peaks of Idaho
 List of mountain ranges in Idaho

References

External links 
 
 Thompson Peak
 SummitPost.org - Thompson Peak
 Sawtooth National Forest - Official Site
 Thompson Peak Trip Report

Mountains of Idaho
Mountains of Custer County, Idaho
Sawtooth Range (Idaho)
Sawtooth Wilderness
Articles containing video clips